Jerky Boys 3 is the third comedy album by prank call artists, the Jerky Boys. The album was released on August 20, 1996, and was the first Jerky Boys album released on the Mercury Records label.

In 1995, prior to the release of this album, the Jerky Boys took a year off before signing with Mercury Records, and recording this album. Also, it was the first time they had added responses to ads they had put in the paper. During this period, the duo released The Jerky Boys: The Movie and the accompanying soundtrack album. Johnny Brennan revealed in his podcast that this is his favorite album, largely due to the new characters introduced.

Track listing
 "Santa's Delivery – Frank Rizzo" (1:09)
 "Lawn Equipment Debate – Sol Rosenberg" (2:18)
 "Balloon Rides – Frank Rizzo" (2:07)
 "The Dresser – Kissel" (1:11)
 "Silly Food – Frank Rizzo" (1:12)
 "Sol's Chainsaw Shock – Sol Rosenberg" (1:13)
 "Stop That – Tarbash" (2:35)
 "Chainsaw Shock, Pt. 2 – Sol Rosenberg" (2:22)
 "Tandem Bicycles – Jack Tor s" (1:39)
 "Safety Gates – Frank Rizzo" (3:30)
 "Bamm! – Curly G." (1:29)
 "Facelift Without Surgery – Jack Tor s" (1:35)
 "Lawnmower Sale – Big Ole' Bad Ass Bob the Cattle Rustler" (2:46)
 "Tarbash's New Shoes – Tarbash" (1:39)
 "Signin' – Rosine" (2:38)
 "No! – Mike Derucki" (:25)
 "Sol's Civil War Memorabilia – Sol Rosenberg" (3:46)
 "Civil War Memorabilia, Pt. 2 – Sol Rosenberg" (2:07)
 "Bad Tomatoes – Nikos" (1:23)
 "Florida, The Tropical State – Jack Tor s" (3:32)
 "TV Repair – Kissel/Pico" (2:35)
 "1-800-How's My Driving? – Frank Rizzo" (2:38)
 "Bad Ass Massage – Big Ole' Bad Ass Bob the Cattle Rustler" (2:36)
 "Paradise – Jack Tor s" (1:27)
 "Body Building – Frank Rizzo" (3:31)
 "Kissel Crooner – Kissel" (1:46)
 "Angry Camper's Dad – Frank Rizzo" (1:49)
 "Bird Feed – Sol Rosenberg" (3:33)
 "New Awnings – Mike Derucki" (3:57)

1996 albums
The Jerky Boys albums
1990s comedy albums
Mercury Records albums